William Edward "Hinky" Harris (July 29, 1935 – September 20, 2001) was a Canadian professional ice hockey player in the National Hockey League (NHL) from 1955 to 1969.

Playing career
Harris began his NHL career with the Toronto Maple Leafs in 1955–56. He helped Toronto win 3 straight Stanley Cups in 1962, 1963, and 1964.  In total, he played 10 seasons with Toronto before being traded in the off season to the Detroit Red Wings along with Andy Bathgate and Gary Jarrett for Larry Jeffrey, Eddie Joyal, Lowell MacDonald, Marcel Pronovost, and Autry Erickson on May 20, 1965. After playing 24 games for Detroit in 1965–66 he was sent down to the Red Wings AHL affiliate Pittsburgh Hornets. He spent the entire 1966–67 season in the AHL with Pittsburgh leading the team with 34 goals and helping them win the Calder Cup Championship.

The following year the National Hockey League expanded from six teams to twelve and on June 6, 1967 Harris was selected by the Oakland Seals in the expansion draft. During his second season with Oakland he was traded to the Pittsburgh Penguins for Bob Dillabough. Harris would retire from professional hockey at the conclusion of the 1968–69 NHL season.

Coaching career
After finishing his playing career in 1970 with the Canadian national team, Harris became head coach of the Swedish national ice hockey team in 1971–72. He then became the first head coach of the Ottawa Nationals in the WHA's inaugural 1972–73 season and coached Team Canada in the 1974 Summit Series against the Soviet Union.  Harris went on to become an assistant coach with the Edmonton Oilers under Glen Sather for two seasons beginning in 1981–82. He ended his coaching career after serving as a head coach in the OHL for the Sudbury Wolves in 1982–83 and 1983–84.

Awards and achievements
 1961–62 – Stanley Cup Champion – Toronto Maple Leafs
 1962–63 – Stanley Cup Champion – Toronto Maple Leafs
 1963–64 – Stanley Cup Champion – Toronto Maple Leafs
 1966-67 - AHL  Champion – Pittsburgh  Hornets

Transactions
May 20, 1965 – Traded by the Toronto Maple Leafs with Andy Bathgate and Gary Jarrett to the Detroit Red Wings for Larry Jeffrey, Eddie Joyal, Lowell MacDonald, Marcel Pronovost and Autry Erickson
June 6, 1967 – Claimed by the Oakland Seals from the Detroit Red Wings in NHL expansion draft
November 28, 1968 – Traded by the Oakland Seals to the Pittsburgh Penguins for Bob Dillabough

Career statistics

Regular season and playoffs

Coaching record

Death
Harris died from cancer, in Toronto, on September 20, 2001.  He was 66 years old.

External links
 

1935 births
2001 deaths
Canada men's national ice hockey team coaches
Canadian ice hockey centres
Canadian ice hockey coaches
Detroit Red Wings players
Edmonton Oilers coaches
Oakland Seals players
Pittsburgh Hornets players
Pittsburgh Penguins players
Rochester Americans players
Ice hockey people from Toronto
Stanley Cup champions
Sudbury Wolves coaches
Sweden men's national ice hockey team coaches
Toronto Maple Leafs players
Toronto Marlboros players
Toronto Toros